Dick Deschaine (April 28, 1932 – May 20, 2018) was a former punter in the National Football League.

Deschaine was born on April 28, 1932 in Menominee, Michigan. He played with the Green Bay Packers for three seasons. During his final season in the NFL, he played with the Cleveland Browns. His career punting average was 42.3 yards.

Deschaine was one of the few NFL players to have never played college football. He died on May 20, 2018.

See also
List of Green Bay Packers players

References

1932 births
2018 deaths
People from Menominee, Michigan
Players of American football from Wisconsin
Green Bay Packers players
Cleveland Browns players
American football punters